Alico may refer to:
 Alico Arena, an athletics facility at Florida Gulf Coast University donated by
 Alico (company)
 ALICO Building, in Waco, Texas
 American Life Insurance Company, now part of MetLife
 Platani (river), a river in Sicily